Intelsat 802 was a communications satellite operated by Intelsat. Launched in 1997 it was operated in geostationary orbit at a longitude of 174 degrees west for around fourteen years.

Satellite
The second of six Intelsat VIII satellites to be launched, Intelsat 802 was built by Lockheed Martin. It was a  spacecraft. The satellite carried a 2xLEROS-1B apogee motor for propulsion and was equipped with 38 C Band transponders and 6 Ku band transponders, powered by 2 solar cells more batteries. It was designed for a fourteen-year service life.

Launch
The launch of Intelsat 802 made use of an Ariane 4 rocket flying from Guiana Space Centre, Kourou, French Guiana. The launch took place at 01:07 UTC on June 25, 1997, with the spacecraft entering a geosynchronous transfer orbit. Intelsat 802 subsequently fired its apogee motor to achieve geostationary orbit.

See also

 1997 in spaceflight

References

Intelsat satellites
Spacecraft launched in 1997
Spacecraft decommissioned in 2010